Defending champion Jim Courier successfully defended his title, defeating Petr Korda in the final, 7–5, 6–2, 6–1 to win the men's singles tennis title at the 1992 French Open.

Stefan Edberg was attempting to complete the career Grand Slam, but lost to Andrei Cherkasov in the third round.

Seeds
The seeded players are listed below. Jim Courier is the champion; others show the round in which they were eliminated.

  Jim Courier (champion)
  Stefan Edberg (third round)
  Pete Sampras (quarterfinals)
  Michael Stich (third round)
  Michael Chang (third round)
  Guy Forget (second round)
  Petr Korda (finalist)
  Goran Ivanišević (quarterfinals)
  Carlos Costa (fourth round)
  Ivan Lendl (second round)
  Andre Agassi (semifinals)
  Richard Krajicek (third round)
  Aaron Krickstein (third round)
  Alexander Volkov (third round)
  Brad Gilbert (first round)
  Jakob Hlasek (first round)

Draw

Finals

Top half

Section 1

Section 2

Section 3

Section 4

Bottom half

Section 5

Section 6

Section 7

Section 8

External links
 Association of Tennis Professionals (ATP) – 1992 French Open Men's Singles draw
1992 French Open – Men's draws and results at the International Tennis Federation

Men's Singles
French Open by year – Men's singles
1992 ATP Tour